was a Japanese daimyō of the mid to late Edo period, who ruled the Hamada Domain. He served in a variety of positions in the Tokugawa shogunate. After serving as magistrate of temples and shrines and Osaka Castle warden, he served for a year as Kyoto Shoshidai. Upon the conclusion of his service as shoshidai, he was made a rōjū; from 1834 to 35, he was chief rōjū (rōjū shusseki). However, his acceptance of bribes in connection to the Sengoku uprising brought him in conflict with Mizuno Tadakuni and his faction in the shogunate, and cost him his position. He retired from his position as daimyō the same year, and died six years later.

References
 Japanese Wikipedia article (26 Oct. 2007)

|-

1779 births
1841 deaths
Rōjū
Kyoto Shoshidai
Daimyo
Matsui-Matsudaira clan